The Christmas Miracle is a 2000 Russian romantic drama film directed by Yury Feting and Andrei Kravchuk, starring Aleksei Kravchenko and Chulpan Khamatova. It has a fairy-tale narrative about a couple who reunite at Christmas after many years apart. It was Kravchuk's debut film as director. The film was released in Russian cinemas on 21 December 2000.

Cast
 Aleksei Kravchenko as Maksim
 Chulpan Khamatova as Masha
 Aleksandr Abdulov as puppeteer
 Sergey Shakurov as cosmonaut
 Yury Kuznetsov as Barankulov
 Svetlana Gaytan as teacher
 Alyona Khmelnitskaya as Anna

References

External links
 

2000 films
2000 romantic drama films
Films directed by Andrei Kravchuk
Russian Christmas films
Russian romantic drama films
2000s Russian-language films
2000 directorial debut films